, the World Checklist of Selected Plant Families accepted 489 species of Philodendron:

A

B

C

D

E

F

G

H

I–J

K–L

M

N–O

P

Q–R

S

T

U–V

W–Z

References

Philodendron